The Battle of Mecca is the name of several battles fought in Mecca:

Battle of Mecca (883) (June 883)
Ottoman return of Mecca 1813 (25 January 1813) 
Battle of Mecca (1916) (June-July 1916) 
Battle of Mecca (1924) (1924)

See also 
 Siege of Mecca (disambiguation)
 Conquest of Mecca